Niall Vallely is an Irish musician, born 1970 in Armagh, Northern Ireland. In 1966 his parents, Brian and Eithne Vallely had founded the Armagh Piper's Club, but he chose to learn the concertina instead, from the age of seven. His brother Cillian plays the uillean pipes and low whistle, learning from Mark Donnelly. Another of his brothers, Caoimhin, plays classical piano, tin whistle and fiddle.  In 1990, Vallely founded the group Nomos, which released two albums before breaking up in 2000. In 1992, Vallely completed a degree in music at University College, Cork.

In 1998, Vallely released a solo album of contemporary and traditional tunes from Ireland and Scotland. He also produced and composed the tunes for Karan Casey's album for children The Seal Maiden. Niall and Karan married in Barga, Italy in 2007. He appears on some of her albums. In 1999, he released his debut solo album, Beyond Words, and in 2003 Callan Bridge with his brother Cillian on uilleann pipes. Over the past few years Vallely has also been spending a lot of time writing new music.  In 2007, he was commissioned by the BBC to compose music for a major TV series, The Flight of the Earls. The resulting piece was then premiered at the Grand Opera House in Belfast as part of the Belfast Festival at Queens and had a subsequent performance at the Irish College in Louvain, Belgium, as part of their Flight of the Earls celebrations.  In 2008, he composed an electro-acoustic piece entitled "Rakish" based on the music of travelling piper Johnny Doran which was premiered at the William Kennedy Piping Festival in Armagh. Recent commissions have included pieces for cellist Kate Ellis, Zoë Conway, and the Vanbrugh String Quartet.

In 2004 he formed Buille with his brother Caoimhín Vallely (piano) and guitarist Paul Meehan.  They released their debut album in 2005 on the Vertical Records label.  They released their second album in 2009, entitled Buille 2.  It featured a diverse range of guests including brother Cillian on uilleann pipes, Zoë Conway on fiddle, Cian O’Duill on viola, Kate Ellis on cello, Neil Yates on trumpet and flugelhorn, Ed Boyd and Paul Meehan on guitars and Brian Morrissey on bodhrán, percussion and banjo.

Discography
 1995   - Áine Uí Cheallaigh - Idir Dhá Chomhairle/In Two Minds (Gael Linn) 
 1995   - Various - River of Sound (Virgin CD + BBC Video)
 1995 - Nomos - I Won't Be Afraid Any More (Solid/Grapevine/Green Linnet)
 1997 - Nomos - Set You Free (Grapevine/Green Linnet)
 1997 - Various - Sult, Spirit of the Music (Hummingbird) (w. Nomos)
 1998 – Gael Force DVD (w. Nomos)
 1999  - Niall Vallely - Beyond Words (Beyond Records)
 2012 - Niall Vallely - Beyond Words (Crow Valley Music)
 1999  - Various - Mega Celtique (w. Nomos)
 1999  - Paddy Keenan - na Keen Affair (Hot Conya Records)     
 2000 - Karan Casey & Friends - The Seal Maiden (Music for Little People)
 2001 - Various - Celtic Christmas, Silver Anniversary Edition (Windham Hill Records)
 2001 - Lewis Nash & David O'Rourke's Celtic Jazz Collective (Mapleshade)
 2001 - Tim O'Brien - Two Journeys (Howdy Skies/Sugarhill Records)
 2001 - Karan Casey - The Winds Begin to Sing (Shanachie)
 2002 - Niall and Cillian Vallely - Callan Bridge (Compass Records)
 2002 - Various - Live From The Katharine Cornell Theater
 2003 - Various - Celtic Compass (Compass Records)
 2003 - Karan Casey - Distant Shore (Shanachie/Vertical)
 2003 - Donal Donnelly and Brian Hanlon – Driven
 2004 - Various - Masters of the Accordion (Arc)
 2004 - Various - Very Best of Celtic Christmas (Windham Hill)
 2004 - Various - Live Recordings From The William Kennedy Piping Festival
 2004 - Various - Other Voices, Songs from a Room 2
 2005 - Karan Casey - Chasing the Sun (Shanachie)
 2005 - Caoimhín Vallely – Strayaway
 2005 - Barry Kerr – The World Looks Away
 2006 – Tejedor – Música na Maleta (Arís Música)
 2007 - Niall Vallely, Paul Meehan, Caoimhin Vallely - Buille (Vertical Records/Compass Records)
 2007 - Various - Excalibur II: The Celtic Ring (EMI)
 2007 - Various - Armagh Pipers Club 40th Anniversary
 2007 - Various - A Christmas Celtic Sojourn Live [CD and DVD]
 2008 - Karan Casey – Ships in the Forest (Compass/Crow Valley Music)
 2008 - Various - Anglo International
 2009 – Buille – Buille 2 (Crow Valley Music)
 2010 – Transatlantic Sessions 4 [CD and DVD] (Whirlie Records)
 2010 - Daimh – Diversions (Greentrax)
 2011 - Highland Sessions [DVD] (Whirlie Records)

References

External links
Niall Vallely
Niall and Cillian Vallely Homepage
Wedding in Barga between Niall and Karan (includes video of the whole family playing at the wedding ceremony

Alumni of University College Cork
Alumni of the University of Limerick
Folk musicians from Northern Ireland
Living people
People educated at St Patrick's Grammar School, Armagh
People from Armagh (city)
Musicians from County Armagh
1970 births